Joseph Buloff (December 6, 1899 – February 27, 1985) was a Jewish actor and director known for his work in Broadway and Yiddish theatre. He received the Itzik Manger Prize for contributions to Yiddish letters in 1974.

Life and career
Buloff was born on December 6, 1899 in Vilna, in what was then the Russian Empire and is now Lithuania.

Buloff debuted on stage with the Jewish State Theatre in Vilna. He joined the Vilna Troupe when he was a teenager, and "his first major success" came in that company's production of Day and Night by S. Ansky. While with the troupe, he also met Luba Kadison, whom he married and remained with until his death six decades later. They had a daughter, Barbara.

Buloff immigrated to the United States in 1927 and worked with Maurice Schwartz's Yiddish theatre company. Buloff and Kadison toured Europe and the Western Hemisphere in the early 1930s, acting with Yiddish troupes in the countries that they visited. Their productions included adaptations of works by Dostoevski and Tolstoy and translated versions of works by Chekhov, Moliere, and Pirandello.

Broadway productions in which Buloff appeared included The Price (1979), The Fifth Season (1975), The Wall (1960), Moonbirds (1959), Once More, With Feeling (1958), Mrs. McThing  (1952), The Whole World Over (1947), Oklahoma! (1943), Spring Again (1941), My Sister Eileen (1940), Morning Star (1940), The Man from Cairo (1938), To Quito and Back (1937), Call Me Ziggy (1937), and Don't Look Now (1936).

On February 27, 1985, Buloff died at his Manhattan home, aged 86. He left a memoir, written in Yiddish, which was translated by Joseph Singer and published by Harvard University Press in 1991 as From the Old Marketplace.

Legacy
Some of Buloff's papers are preserved at YIVO and at the New York Public Library for the Performing Arts.

Filmography

References

External links

  
 
 Joseph Buloff papers, 1925–1993, held by the Billy Rose Theatre Division, New York Public Library for the Performing Arts
 Joseph Buloff's Acting from the Yiddish Book Center
 Performing alongside Joseph Buloff in "Yoshke Muzikant" from the Yiddish Book Center

1899 births
1985 deaths
20th-century American male actors
20th-century Lithuanian male actors
American male film actors
American male stage actors
American people of Lithuanian-Jewish descent
Jewish American male actors
Lithuanian Jews
Lithuanian emigrants to the United States
Lithuanian male film actors
20th-century American Jews
Itzik Manger Prize recipients